The Moscow Marathon is a running and sporting event held annually in Moscow, Russia. The official marathon distance of 42.195 kilometers (26 miles 385 yards) is set up as a citywide road race where professional athletes and amateur runners jointly participate. First initiated in 2013, as a successor of Moscow International Peace Marathon (est. 1980), the event traditionally takes place on the last weekend in September.

Moscow Marathon certified by IAAF. It is a member of AIMS.

The race was canceled in 2021 due to the coronavirus pandemic.

Course 

The marathon is run over a largely flat course around the Moscow River, and spans , but with partially high elevation up to 100 m.

 Moscow Marathon map 2018

Winners 

Key: Course record (in bold)

Participants

References 

 
Recurring events established in 2013
Annual sporting events in Russia
Marathons in Russia
Autumn events in Russia
Sports competitions in Moscow
Athletics in Moscow